In qualification for the 2007 Rugby World Cup, 19 countries in the Pan American Rugby Association (PARA) compete for 3 direct entries and 1 repechage place (Repechage 1) against the winner of Africa 2 v Europe 4.

Qualification Process

Round 1a
It was the 2005 NACRA Rugby Championship with Caribbean teams. Nine teams involved The winner going through to Round 3b.

Round 1b
CONSUR (Confederation Sudamericana de Rugby) 2nd Division. One pool of four teams - winner progresses to round 2.

Round 2
Bottom two CONSUR Division 1 teams, plus winner of Round 1b, form one pool of three. Winner progresses to Round 3a.

 Round 3a
Top two CONSUR Division 1 teams, plus winner of Round 2, form one pool of three. Winner progresses directly to RWC 2007 as Americas 1. Runner up progresses to Round 4.

Round 3b
USA, Canada and winner of Round 1a form one pool of three. Winner progresses directly to RWC 2007 as Americas 2. Runner up progresses to Round 4.

Round 4
Home and away playoff. Winner qualifies for RWC 2007 as Americas 3. Runner up enters Repechage round.

Round 1a - 2005

Barbados - advances to Round 3b.

Preliminary qualifier
One-off match. St Lucia progress to South Pool.

South Pool
Barbados go into playoff vs winner of North Pool (Bahamas).

Final Standings

Match Schedule

North Pool
Bahamas beat Cayman Islands on head to head to win pool, go into playoff against winner of South Pool (Barbados).

Final Standings

Match Schedule

Playoff - Winner North Pool vs Winner South Pool
Barbados progresses to Round 3b.

Round 1b - 2004
CONSUR 2nd Division. Home OR Away basis. Brazil progresses to Round 2.

Final Standings

Match Schedule

Round 2 - 2005
Home OR Away basis. Chile progresses to Round 3a.

Final Standings

Match Schedule

Round 3a – July 2006

Home OR Away basis. Argentina progresses directly to RWC 2007 as Americas 1. Uruguay progresses to Round 4. 

Current Standings

Match Schedule

Round 3b – July 2006
Home OR Away basis. Canada progresses directly to RWC 2007 as Americas 2. USA progresses to Round 4.

Final Standings

Match Schedule

Round 4 – 2006
Winner (USA) progresses directly to RWC 2007 as Americas 3. Runner up (Uruguay) progresses to Repechage round as Americas 4, to play the winner of Africa 2 v Europe 4, for Repechage 1.

Match Schedule

United States win 75-20 on aggregate

External links
 World Cup website

2007
Americas
2004 in South American rugby union
2005 in South American rugby union
2006 in South American rugby union
2005 in North American rugby union
2006 in North American rugby union